J.Pascal's Hardware and Furniture was a Montreal, Quebec, Canada-based chain of hardware and furniture stores.

History
J.Pascal had long been a hardware chain only, but subsequently expanded to furniture retailing. Until the 1970s, the company's name was J.Pascal Hardware Co. After the furniture division was created in the 1980s, the company's corporate name became J.Pascal Inc. Although both operated under the trade name "Pascal" and shared a common logo, the hardware and furniture chains were kept separate in terms of operations and outlets. The hardware stores were found mostly in enclosed shopping malls and commercial streets, while the furniture stores were in strip malls.

J.Pascal was in business for almost 90 years and operated 26 hardware and furniture stores in the provinces of Quebec, Ontario and New Brunswick before going bankrupt on May 16, 1991. Only the flagship hardware division was closed. The spin-off furniture division would survive another three years before closing in 1994. It was the last major Canadian furniture retailer to go bankrupt.
After Pascal went out of business, a small furniture chain started to use the name under the trademark "Club Meubles Pascal", resulting in a legal battle with J.Pascal in 1996.

Throughout its existence J.Pascal remained a family business, belonging to three generations of the Pascal family. It was founded in 1903 by Jacob Pascal, and then taken over by his sons, Maxwell Pascal, Arthur Pascal, Hyman Pascal, and Cecil Pascal.

Pascal Hotel Supplies
Pascal Hotel Supplies wasn't affected by the bankruptcy of the parent company and was in operation until 2008. Pascal Hotel Supplies' sole store was located on Bleury Street in downtown Montreal, not far from the former headquarters of Pascal. Pascal Hotel Supplies remained the property of the Pascal family until the early 2000s. The new owners retained the Pascal name for the business until its closure in 2008.

Pascal Architectural Hardware
The remaining part of the Pascals empire specialises in hardware relating to building finishing, e.g., locks and hinges. It is located on Queen Mary Road in the Côte-des-Neiges neighbourhood of Montreal.

Selected locations
This is a list of locations operated by Pascal during its lifetime.

Quebec

Dorval — Jardins Dorval
Greenfield Park — Place Greenfield Park 
 Lachine — Rue Notre Dame 
Lasalle — Carrefour Angrignon 
 Lasalle — Rue Dollard 
Laval — Carrefour Laval 
Montreal — Faubourg Sainte-Catherine
 Montreal — Galeries Normandie 
 Montreal — Place Versailles 
 Montreal — Cote des Neiges Rd. 
 Montreal — Rue de Bleury (901 Bleury Head Office and Store below)
 Montreal — Ave Du Parc
 Montreal — Rue de Bleury (restaurant supplies)
Pointe-Claire — Fairview Pointe-Claire 
Quebec City/Vanier — Place Fleur de Lys 
St-Jean-sur-Richelieu— Rue Pierre Caisse (adjacent to Carrefour Richelieu) 
Saint-Laurent — Place Vertu 
 Saint-Laurent — Centre Le Bazaar (furniture) 
Saint-Leonard — Rue Jean-Talon Est, near Boulevard Langelier (furniture)
 Saint-Leonard — Boulevard Shopping Centre 
Sainte-Foy — Place Laurier 
Sherbrooke — Carrefour de l'Estrie 
Trois-Rivières-Ouest - Carrefour Trois Rivieres Ouest 
Verdun — Boul. Wellington
Westmount — Sherbrooke St.

Ontario
Brampton — Shoppers World Brampton (hardware)
 Gloucester — Gloucester Centre
Mississauga — Dixie Outlet Mall (hardware); Hurontario Street (furniture)
Nepean — Merivale Road in Meadowlands Mall
Ottawa — Rideau Street
Scarborough — Warehouse (Finch Avenue East and Markham Road), store (Woodside Square at Finch Avenue East and McCowan Road)
Thornill — Thornhill Square
Newmarket — Upper Canada Mall (hardware & furniture)

References

External links
 Maxwell Pascal
 Arthur Pascal's profile

Defunct retail companies of Canada
Furniture retailers of Canada
Hardware stores of Canada
Shops in Montreal
Jewish Canadian history
Companies based in Montreal
Defunct companies of Quebec
Retail companies established in 1903
Retail companies disestablished in 1991
1903 establishments in Quebec
1990s disestablishments in Quebec
Companies that have filed for bankruptcy in Canada
Privately held companies of Canada